Power Chess is a chess-playing video game originally released in September 1996 by Sierra On-Line for the Microsoft Windows 95 operating system. Later revisions of the software were released as "Power Chess '98" and "Power Chess 2.0".

Engine 
Its chess engine is "Wchess" by David Kittinger, which played against Deep Blue in the 1995 World Computer Championship in Hong Kong.  The game is included as a watchable "Great Game" in Power Chess.

Gameplay 
Power Chess had two major innovations: the program would adjust its level during the game trying to match that of the player (presaging Chessbase Fritz's Friend Mode). In addition, after each game, a female voice, the Queen, walks the player through the game, pointing out and explaining where the player could have played better.  The program keeps track of the player's rating.  Players can also create their own characters with differing gameplay styles and difficulty.

Narration 
The voice of the Power Chess Queen was voiced in English and French by voiceover artist Natacha LaFerriere.

"Great Games" 
A collection of famous games is included for review and study, each one narrated turn-by-turn by the Queen. The games include:
 The Evergreen Game, Adolf Anderssen vs. Jean Dufresne (1852)
 The Opera Game, Paul Morphy vs. Duke Karl of Brunswick and Count Isouard (1858)
 Wilhelm Steinitz vs. Curt von Bardeleben (1895)
 Ruger vs. Gebhard (1915)
 Vasily Smyslov vs. Bobby Fischer (1970)
 Wchess vs. Deep Blue (1995)
 Deep Blue vs. Garry Kasparov, Game 1 (1996)

Reception
Power Chess won Computer Games Strategy Pluss award for the 1996 "traditional" game of the year.

See also
Comparison of chess video games

References

External links
 

1996 video games
Windows games
Windows-only games
Sierra Entertainment games
Chess software
Video games developed in the United States